Peter Friis Jensen (born 2 May 1988) is a retired Danish professional footballer who played as a goalkeeper.

Club career

Randers
Friis is a product of Randers FC, and has played for the team in the most of his youth career. He got his contract extended in June 2007 and signed his first professional contract the following summer. Friis didn't play any games for the first team in this season, but was on the bench for the last two games of the season.

His contract was extended once again after the 2008/09 season until 1 January 2010. Friis was in negotiations with Viborg in November about a new contract, but due to the financial crisis, they couldn't offer him as much as he wanted, even if they wanted to. So his contract expired but 28 days later, he signed a new contract with the club for 6 months. Friis' contract was extended once again after the 6 months, this time until 2012. He played his first game for Randers on 25 August 2010 in a Danish Cup game against VSK Aarhus, which they won 4-1. The first choice, David Ousted, got injured with 4 league games left. Friis played the last 4 games and did very well. In the beginning of the 2012/13, Friis got injured and was operated in his knee. Friis wanted to be the first choice and he considered a move away. He didn't play a single game in the 2012/13 season.

Friis was on the bench for the first 10 games of the season in the following season, but played the rest of the league games.

Viborg
On 16 July 2014 Viborg FF announced, that they had signed Friis from Randers. After Viborg was relegated to the Danish 1st Division for the 2017/18 season, he left the club together with 5 teammates.

Silkeborg
Friis signed a two-year contract with Danish Superliga club Silkeborg IF.

Vendsyssel
On 8 July 2019, Friis signed with Vendsyssel FF. On 22 August 2021, 33-year old Friis confirmed, that he had been forced to retire due to persistent knee problems.

References

External links
Danish Superliga statistics

1988 births
Living people
Danish men's footballers
Randers FC players
Viborg FF players
Silkeborg IF players
Vendsyssel FF players
Danish Superliga players
Danish 1st Division players
Association football goalkeepers
Association football defenders
IF Midtdjurs players